Zaldy Villa is a Filipino politician from the island province of Siquijor in Central Visayas Region in the Philippines. He is currently serving as a Governor of Siquijor. He was first elected as Governor of the province in 2013 and was re-elected in and 2016 and 2019.

References

External links
Province of Suquijor Official Website

Living people
Governors of Siquijor
PDP–Laban politicians
Year of birth missing (living people)